Miguel Ángel Moyá Rumbo (born 2 April 1984) is a Spanish professional footballer who plays as a goalkeeper.

He played 274 La Liga games over 15 seasons, representing in the competition Mallorca, Valencia, Getafe, Atlético Madrid and Real Sociedad.

At youth level, Moyá earned 38 caps for Spain.

Club career

Mallorca
Born in Binissalem, Majorca, Moyá made his professional debut with hometown RCD Mallorca on 29 August 2004 in a 0–1 home loss against Real Madrid, appearing in 32 La Liga games for a team that barely avoided relegation (17th). After backing up another youth system product, veteran Toni Prats, for two years, he became the undisputed starter.

From 2007 to 2009, however, Moyá struggled mightily with injuries, only appearing in 13 matches for the Balearic Islands side in the latter season.

Valencia
In late June 2009, Moyá agreed on a move to fellow top-division club Valencia CF for about €5 million. On 5 August, in a 2–0 preseason defeat at Manchester United, he featured more than 30 minutes as central midfielder after all the replacements had been made by Unai Emery and an injury occurred; the score was then at 0–1.

Moyá made his official debut against Sevilla FC in the league's opener, a 2–0 home win, but quickly lost his job to veteran César Sánchez after some costly mistakes.

Getafe
On 15 June 2011, Moyá joined Getafe CF on loan as part of the deal involving Dani Parejo. At the end of the campaign, in which he only missed two league games as the Madrid outskirts team again retained their status, he signed a permanent four-year contract.

Moyá suffered a knee injury in March 2014 during a game against RCD Espanyol, being ruled out for the remainder of the season.

Atlético Madrid
On 4 June 2014, Moyá signed a three-year contract with league champions Atlético Madrid, for a reported fee of €3 million. During his presentation on the following day, he said: "What better moment than this one to arrive, the demands will be strong but when a football player is born, he wishes to be in a club such as this one. Atlético de Madrid is one of Europe's greatest teams and has clearly demonstrated it".

Moyá made his competitive debut in the first leg of the 2014 Supercopa de España on 19 August, a 1–1 draw at Real Madrid. He remained a starter until the final stretch of the season but, after suffering an injury to his left thigh in a UEFA Champions League game against Bayer 04 Leverkusen, he lost his position to Jan Oblak, going on to be restricted to Copa del Rey matches throughout the next three seasons.

Real Sociedad
On 27 February 2018, Moyá was released from his contract with Atlético and joined Real Sociedad on a two-year deal as an emergency signing following the injury of Gerónimo Rulli. Though mainly a backup for Álex Remiro in 2019–20, he played the last few games as the team from San Sebastián qualified for the UEFA Europa League, and was rewarded with a new one-year deal in August.

International career
A Spain under-21 international, Moyá participated in the qualification stage for the 2007 UEFA European Championship, lost on aggregate to Italy in the play-off round.

Club statistics

Honours
Atlético Madrid
UEFA Europa League: 2017–18
Supercopa de España: 2014
UEFA Champions League runner-up: 2015–16

Real Sociedad
Copa del Rey: 2019–20

Spain U16
UEFA European Under-16 Championship: 2001

Spain U19
UEFA European Under-19 Championship: 2002

Spain U20
FIFA U-20 World Cup runner-up: 2003

References

External links
Atlético Madrid official profile

Real Mallorca bio 

1984 births
Living people
Spanish footballers
Footballers from Mallorca
Association football goalkeepers
La Liga players
Segunda División B players
RCD Mallorca B players
RCD Mallorca players
Valencia CF players
Getafe CF footballers
Atlético Madrid footballers
Real Sociedad footballers
Spain youth international footballers
Spain under-21 international footballers